The Wissberg is a mountain of the Urner Alps, located east of Engelberg in Central Switzerland. Its summit lies on the border between the cantons of Obwalden and Uri.

References

External links
 Wissberg on Hikr

Mountains of the Alps
Mountains of Switzerland
Mountains of Obwalden
Mountains of the canton of Uri
Obwalden–Uri border